Mariniphaga sediminis is a Gram-negative and facultatively anaerobic bacterium from the genus of Mariniphaga which has been isolated from sediments from the coast of Weihai.

References

Bacteroidia
Bacteria described in 2015